Homa (also Romanized as Homā, Huma, and Hūmeh; also known as Qal‘eh Huma and Qal‘eh-ye Hūmeh) is a village in Farsesh Rural District, in the Central District of Aligudarz County, Lorestan Province, Iran. At the 2006 census, its population was 451, in 80 families.

References 

Towns and villages in Aligudarz County